Portrait of Ferenc Herczeg is an undated sculpture by Hungarian sculptor István Szentgyörgyi.

The title Portrait of Ferenc Herceg is misleading because the picture shows the reverse of  the bronze medal/plate in question and does not represent the portrait of the playwright Herczeg, but  shows  the portrait of Count István Széchenyi, who initiated the construction of the Széchenyi Chain Bridge in Budapest. The work is a reference to Ferenc Herczeg's drama “The Bridge”,  a fictional love story about the  reason for the construction.

The  description of the bronze "Ferenc Herceg (reverse)"
reads: "The undated medal represents the portrait of Count István Széchenyi to Herceg's drama 'The Bridge' ". 

The Bronze medal measures   x  and is currently on display at the Hungarian National Museum in Budapest.

References

Bronze sculptures in Hungary